George Menougong (born May 18, 1985 in Yaoundé) is a Cameroon-born Hungarian football player. who currently plays for Mezőkövesd-Zsóry SE.

References

External links
 
 George Menougong profile at HLSZ

1985 births
Living people
Footballers from Yaoundé
Cameroonian footballers
Association football forwards
Jászapáti VSE footballers
Nyíregyháza Spartacus FC players
Bőcs KSC footballers
Diósgyőri VTK players
Kazincbarcikai SC footballers
Mezőkövesdi SE footballers
Nemzeti Bajnokság I players
Cameroonian expatriate footballers
Expatriate footballers in Hungary
Cameroonian expatriate sportspeople in Hungary